The 2007 Anambra State gubernatorial election was the 6th gubernatorial election of Anambra State. Held on April 14, 2007, the People's Democratic Party nominee Emmanuel Nnamdi Uba won the election, defeating Virginia Etiaba of the All Progressives Grand Alliance.

Results 
A total of 14 candidates contested in the election. Emmanuel Nnamdi Uba from the People's Democratic Party won the election, defeating Virginia Etiaba from the All Progressives Grand Alliance. Registered voters was 1,844,819.

References 

Anambra State gubernatorial elections
Anambra gubernatorial
April 2007 events in Nigeria